Luca Lombardi (born 6 December 2002) is an Italian professional footballer who plays as a midfielder for  club Alessandria, on loan from Pescara.

Career

Early career
Lombardi began his youth career at hometown club Ancona, before leaving the club in 2017 following the club's disestablishment. After brief experiences with Chievo and Fano, Lombardi moved to Recanatese in summer 2018 on a free transfer.

Following his first-team debut on 17 February 2019, Lombardi became a starter for Recanatese in Serie D, playing six games in 2018–19. The following season, Lombardi played 16 games in the first half of the 2019–20 Serie D season.

Monza
On 2 January 2000, Lombardi joined Serie C side Monza. He made his professional debut on 27 October 2020, coming on as a substitute in a Coppa Italia third round game against Pordenone; Monza won the match on penalties.

On 28 January 2021, Lombardi was sent on a six-month loan to Teramo in the Serie C. He played two league games in 2020–21, both as a starter. On 20 July 2021, Lombardi moved to Serie C side Vis Pesaro on a one-year loan.

Pescara
On 13 July 2022, Lombardi joined Serie C side Pescara, alongside teammate Daniele Sommariva, as part of a swap deal involving Alessandro Sorrentino moving the other way.

Loan to Alessandria
On 12 August 2022, he joined Alessandria on loan.

Personal life
Lombardi's father, Massimo, is a football coach.

Career statistics

References

2002 births
Living people
Sportspeople from Ancona
Footballers from Marche
Italian footballers
Association football midfielders
U.S. Ancona 1905 players
A.C. ChievoVerona players
Alma Juventus Fano 1906 players
U.S.D. Recanatese 1923 players
A.C. Monza players
S.S. Teramo Calcio players
Vis Pesaro dal 1898 players
Delfino Pescara 1936 players
U.S. Alessandria Calcio 1912 players
Serie D players
Serie C players